Delias kristianiae is a rare Papuan butterfly that is named after the former First Lady of Indonesia, Kristiani Herrawati. Kristiani Herrawati was presented with a specimen of D. kristianiae after the species was named, which she donated to a museum.

References

kristianiae
Butterflies described in 2006
Butterflies of Indonesia